The Casino Del Sol Golf Classic is a golf tournament on the Epson Tour, the LPGA's developmental tour. It has been a part of the Epson Tour's schedule since 2021. It is held at Sewailo Golf Club in Tucson, Arizona.

At the inaugural event in 2021, Ruixin Liu trailed by six strokes after 54 holes, but found momentum on the last day's final nine. Making birdies on the last four holes of the day helped Liu finish regulation at 15-under par and tie with Morgane Métraux. On the first playoff hole both players made par, but on the second Liu went right for the flag and secured her win by holing her birdie putt.

Winners

References

External links

Coverage on Epson Tour website

Symetra Tour events
Golf in Arizona
Recurring sporting events established in 2021